Musical Romance may refer to:

 Musical Romance (1941 film), a 1941 Cuban film
 Musical Romance (1947 film), a 1947 Argentine musical comedy film
 Musical Romance (horse), winner of the 2011 Breeders' Cup
 Musical romance, a genre